Darren Millane (9 August 1965 – 7 October 1991) was an Australian rules footballer who played for the Collingwood Football Club in the Australian Football League (AFL).

One of the toughest and finest wingmen of his era, Millane's tragic death in a car accident at the age of 26, only a year after starring in the Magpies' drought-breaking premiership, is considered one of Australian football's saddest moments.

Early life
Darren Millane was one of three sons born to Robert Joseph Millane and his wife Denise. His brothers, John and Sean, also played football for Dandenong.

AFL career
Millane was considered by Sydney and St Kilda, but Hawthorn won the chance, with Millane training at Glenferrie with the Hawks, but did not like the atmosphere and went back to captain Dandenong in the Victorian Football Association. Collingwood snapped him up and Millane liked what he saw, and his football career came along nicely, debuting in 1984, aged 19.

In 1987, Millane won the best-and-fairest award. He found his place on the wing and was a footballer known for his toughness and attitude towards the game. He was most likely the recipient on the end of the kick-outs because of his strength. Although his skills were occasionally poor, at his best he found and used the football well, becoming a favourite to fans at Victoria Park.

In 1990, the premiership-drought-breaking year for the Magpies, Millane was at his peak. He won the AFL Players Association MVP Award, now known as the Leigh Matthews Trophy; was selected in the AFL Team of the Year for the first time; and came second in Collingwood's best and fairest; but it was his finals campaign that was recognised. He broke his thumb just before the series, but continued to play with painkillers during the campaign. In the 1990 Grand Final, against Essendon, he had 24 touches and ended up throwing the ball up in the air as the siren went at 5:11 pm to end Collingwood's 32-year drought on 6 October.

Career highlights

Collingwood best and fairest 1987
Collingwood runner-up best and fairest 1990
AFL Team of the Year 1990
Leigh Matthews Trophy 1990
Collingwood premiership side 1990
Collingwood Team of the Century member

Death

On 7 October 1991, Millane was killed in a car crash while intoxicated. In the early morning of the day, he was driving on Queens Road, near Albert Park Lake, before he clipped a semi-trailer and rolled his car, being killed instantly. The autopsy revealed his blood alcohol content was 0.322 — almost six-and-a-half times the legal driving limit of 0.05. He was on his way to his Noble Park home, and that day was set to join 19 other members of the 1990 premiership side. The reunion did not go ahead, as players, officials and supporters went instead to mourn Millane's death at Victoria Park.

Millane's funeral was held at the Dandenong Town Hall, where more than 5000 people attended, while the large crowd outside heard the service on a loudspeaker. Millane's guernsey with No. 42 on it was laid on the coffin, while the 1990 flag hung in the background at half-mast. The No. 42 guernsey has since been retired from the club.  In 2011 there were discussions to bring it back to commemorate the 20th anniversary of Millane's death.

References

External links

1965 births
1991 deaths
Collingwood Football Club players
Collingwood Football Club Premiership players
Copeland Trophy winners
Driving under the influence
Leigh Matthews Trophy winners
Road incident deaths in Victoria (Australia)
Australian rules footballers from Melbourne
Victorian State of Origin players
One-time VFL/AFL Premiership players
People from Dandenong, Victoria